Andreas Kofler (born 17 May 1984) is an Austrian former ski jumper.

Career 

Andreas Kofler grew up in Tyrol, in the Austrian Alps. He is a member of the ski jumping club SV Innsbruck-Bergisel, together with Gregor Schlierenzauer.

Kofler won his first individual competition in the World Cup on 4 February 2006. Two days later, he came in second place in the team competition. At the 2006 Winter Olympics in Turin, Italy, Kofler won the silver medal in the individual competition, finishing only 0.1 points behind Thomas Morgenstern, his teammate on the squad with whom he would later win the Olympic gold medal in the team competition. At the Nordic Ski World Championships 2007 in Sapporo, Japan, Kofler won the gold medal in the team competition and finished in sixth place in the individual competition. At the end of the season, he arrived in second place at the Nordic Tournament, beaten only by Adam Małysz.

After starting well into the 2007/08 season, finishing in second place behind Morgenstern twice, Kofler crashed twice during competitions, in Engelberg and in Oberstdorf. Despite not being seriously injured, Kofler struggled to shake off his poor form for this and the next season.

In the 2009-2010, Kofler came in third place in Engelberg, ending his bad streak. During the same season, Kofler managed to win the prestigious Four Hills Tournament, ahead of Janne Ahonen and Wolfgang Loitzl, after winning the first event of the tournament in Oberstdorf. Kofler could not meet expectations in the first event (on the normal hill) of the 2010 Winter Olympics in Vancouver, coming in 19th place. Nonetheless, he finished in fourth place on the large hill, only one point from the podium, and won the team competition with his teammates Wolfgang Loitzl, Thomas Morgenstern and Gregor Schlierenzauer—his second Olympic gold medal after 2006.

During the 2010/11 season, Kofler recorded three individual wins, including the first event of the season in Kuusamo, Finland.

Despite a training deficit due to back problems related to his spinal discs, Kofler started the 2011/12 season by winning the first two events, which took place in Lillehammer, Norway.

World Cup

Standings

Wins

Personal life 

In 2007, Andreas Kofler started a four-year formation to become a member of the Austrian police force, as part of a program for competitive athletes. In May 2011, Kofler passed his final examinations and hence concluded his formation.
His hobbies include telemark skiing, football, surfing and climbing.
Andreas Kofler currently resides in Thaur, Tyrol.

References

External links 

  

1984 births
Austrian male ski jumpers
Living people
Olympic gold medalists for Austria
Olympic silver medalists for Austria
Olympic ski jumpers of Austria
Ski jumpers at the 2006 Winter Olympics
Ski jumpers at the 2010 Winter Olympics
Sportspeople from Innsbruck
Olympic medalists in ski jumping
FIS Nordic World Ski Championships medalists in ski jumping
Medalists at the 2010 Winter Olympics
Medalists at the 2006 Winter Olympics
21st-century Austrian people